The 1987 season was Molde's 13th season in the top flight of Norwegian football. This season Molde competed in 1. divisjon (first tier) and the Norwegian Cup.

In the league, Molde finished in 2nd position, 3 points behind winners Moss. On 10 October, Molde met Moss at Molde Stadion in the final round of the season. They would have become champions if they had defeated Moss, but lost the game 0–2. The match attended 14,973 spectators, which is the all-time home attendance record for Molde FK.

Molde participated in the 1987 Norwegian Cup. They reached the Third Round where they lost 0–2 away against Sunndal and were eliminated from the competition.

Squad
Source:

Friendlies

Competitions

1. divisjon

Results summary 

Source:

Positions by round

Results

League table

Norwegian Cup

Squad statistics

Appearances and goals
Lacking information:
Appearance statistics from Norwegian Cup rounds 2 (6–8 players) and 3 (8–10 players) are missing.

 
 

 

|}

Goalscorers

See also
Molde FK seasons

References

External links
nifs.no

1987
Molde